Atanasio Ndongo Miyone was an Equatoguinean musician, writer and Fang political figure. He wrote the lyrics to Equatorial Guinea's national anthem, Caminemos pisando las sendas de nuestra inmensa felicidad. He was executed in 1969 following a failed coup to depose Francisco Macías Nguema, the first ruler of an independent Equatorial Guinea.

Political career
In the period leading up to Equatorial Guinea's independence from Spain, Ndongo led one of the country's major political parties, the Movimiento Nacional de Liberación de la Guinea Ecuatorial (MONALIGE). He established the party in 1959 while living in Gabon; as MONALIGE was an African nationalist party that campaigned for Equatoguinean independence, he led the party from abroad due to Spanish suppression of independence movements at the time. After Spain granted Equatorial Guinea independence in 1968, he was defeated by Macías in the country's first elections; though he became the nation's foreign minister, he remained discontent with the outcome. In March of the following year, Ndongo was framed by Macías about a fake a coup against him, as an excuse that lead to Ndongo's execution on March 26, 1969.

Equatorial Guinea's national anthem
Ndongo wrote the lyrics for Equatorial Guinea's national anthem, "Caminemos pisando las sendas de nuestra inmensa felicidad" ("Let Us Tread the Path of our Immense Happiness"), in 1968. The music was composed by Ramiro Sanchez Lopes, who was a Spanish lieutenant and the deputy director of music at the army headquarters located in Madrid; he received 25,000 pesetas for his efforts. Ndongo's anthem was first played on October 12, 1968, Equatorial Guinea's independence day, and was well-received by his countrymen.

The lyrics of the anthem were influenced by the end of Equatorial Guinea's colonization, with de-colonization being a main theme.

See also

 Caminemos pisando la senda#Spanish text
 Music of Equatorial Guinea
 Equatoguinean literature in Spanish

References

Year of birth missing
Foreign ministers of Equatorial Guinea
Equatoguinean writers
Equatoguinean male writers
Equatoguinean music
Equatoguinean politicians
1969 deaths
Deaths in Equatorial Guinea